Tunb Rural District is a Rural District (dehestan) in Tunb District, Abumusa County, Hormozgan Province, Iran. At the 2006 census, its population was 155, in 49 families.  The rural district has one village.

References 

Rural Districts of Hormozgan Province
Abumusa County